Bryony or Briony is a feminine given name derived from the name of the plant. It may refer to:

 Bryony Afferson (born 1983), British actress and musician
 Briony Akle (born c. 1977), Australian netball player and coach
 Bryony Botha (born 1997), New Zealand cyclist
 Bryony Brind (1960–2015), British ballerina
 Briony Cole (born 1983), Australian diver
 Bryony Coles (born 1946), British archaeologist
 Bryony Frost (born 1995), British jockey
 Bryony Gordon (born 1980), British journalist
 Bryony Griffith (born 1977), British musician
 Bryony Hannah (born 1984), British actress
 Bryony Kimmings (born 1981), British artist
 Bryony Lavery (born 1947), British dramatist
 Briony McRoberts (1957–2013), English actress
 Bryony Marks (born c.1971), Australian screen composer
 Bryony Page (born 1990), British gymnast
 Briony Penn (born 1960), Canadian author and environmental activist
 Briony Scott (born 1963), Australian educator and columnist
 Bryony Shaw (born 1983), British windsurfer
 Bryony van Velzen (born 1996), Dutch cyclist
 Bryony Worthington, Baroness Worthington (born 1971), British environmentalist

English feminine given names
Given names derived from plants or flowers